Council elections in England were held on Thursday 3 May 2018. Elections were held in all 32 London boroughs, 34 metropolitan boroughs, 67 district and borough councils and 17 unitary authorities. There were also direct elections for the mayoralties of Hackney, Lewisham, Newham, Tower Hamlets and Watford.

With the exception of those areas that have had boundary changes, the seats up for election were last contested in the 2014 local elections.

A parliamentary by-election in West Tyrone took place the same day. Various other local by-elections also took place.

Seats held prior to the election

According to a BBC News estimate, taking into account boundary changes, the major political parties are effectively defending the following 'notional' numbers of council seats on election day:

Labour Party – 2,278 seats
Conservative Party – 1,365 seats
Liberal Democrats – 462 seats
UK Independence Party – 126 seats
Greens – 31 seats

These numbers are how many seats each party won at the previous comparable election, generally in 2014, rather than which party held the seat on the eve of the election. Some other news agencies, such as the Press Association, compare against the party holding a seat on the eve of the election, leading to a different analysis of gains and losses.

There are also 48 Residents Associations' councillors, and 100 'other' / independent councillors.

Eligibility to vote 
All registered electors (British, Irish, Commonwealth and European Union citizens) aged 18 or over on polling day were entitled to vote in the local elections. A person with two homes (such as a university student having a term-time address and living at home during holidays) was able to register to vote at both addresses as long as the addresses were not in the same electoral area, and was able to vote in the local elections for the two different local councils.

In certain councils, there was a trial system in place where photo ID was required to vote. These councils were: Swindon, Gosport, Woking, Bromley, and Watford. An estimated 4,000 electors were turned away from polling stations across these trial areas as a result of not having the appropriate form of ID.

Results
The number of councils controlled by each party following the election are shown in the table below. Both Labour and the Liberal Democrats made modest gains in terms of their respective number of councillors, whereas the Conservatives made a net loss of 35 seats. UKIP lost nearly all of the 126 seats they were defending, with only 3 councillors elected.

Overall results

Results in London

The following table shows the aggregate results for the 32 councils that were up for election in London.

†Due to boundary changes, the figures for seat losses/gains are notional changes calculated by the BBC, and do not match up precisely to the London-wide results in 2014.

Results outside of London

The following table shows the aggregate results for the 118 councils that were up for election outside of London.

Only four councils switched from a majority for one party to another. The Conservatives gained Redditch from Labour, and lost control of three councils to the Liberal Democrats: Kingston upon Thames, Richmond upon Thames and South Cambridgeshire. The Liberal Democrats also gained Three Rivers District Council from no overall control. Labour gained a majority on three councils that had been under no overall control (Kirklees, Plymouth and Tower Hamlets) while losing their majority on two (Derby and Nuneaton and Bedworth). The Conservatives gained a majority on one council that had been under no overall control (Basildon) while losing their majority on two (Mole Valley and Trafford).

Labour won the inaugural mayoral election for the Sheffield City Region. Five other mayoral elections saw no change in the winning party: Labour held four and the Liberal Democrats held one.

Analysis
This was the first set of local elections since the 2017 general election. Most of the seats up for election had last been contested in the 2014 local elections.

Because the group of local councils varies with each cycle of local elections, the BBC and other analysts calculated a projected national vote share, which aims to assess what the council results indicate the UK-wide vote would be if the results were repeated at a general election. The BBC's estimate put Labour on 35% of the vote (up 8% since 2017), the Conservatives on 35% (down 3%), the Liberal Democrats on 16% (down 2%). In the May 2017 local elections, the projected national voteshare was 38% for the Conservatives, 27% for Labour, 18% for the Liberal Democrats and 5% for UKIP. When votes were still being counted, media reports widely described the result as "mixed" for both Labour and the Conservatives. The results suggested that support for the parties had not moved much since the general election 11 months earlier. Some reports considered the results a relief for Theresa May and the Conservatives.

Ben Margulies, a research fellow at the University of Warwick, noted how the United Kingdom Independence Party's collapse in vote share directly benefited the Conservatives as they committed to exiting the European Union. Margulies stated that the Conservatives' position with the electorate will "remain perched on a precipice". Matthew Mokhefi-Ashton, a politics lecturer at Nottingham Trent University, argued that Labour had set their expectations too high and thus made the actual result look disappointing by comparison. David Cutts, a professor of political science at the University of Birmingham, described the Liberal Democrats' performance in the election as "underwhelming" in contrast to the media response, arguing that the party only made moderate gains in their strongholds from before the Liberal-Conservative coalition and council areas that were seen as "Strong Remain" and "Strong Leave". Cutts argued that the next local elections in England are a greater test of their stability as they feature substantially more strongholds.

London boroughs

All seats in the 32 London borough councils were up for election.

Metropolitan boroughs

Whole council

4 metropolitan boroughs had all of their seats up for election following boundary changes.

One-third of council

One third of the seats in 30 metropolitan boroughs were up for election:

Unitary authorities

Whole council

One unitary authority had all of its seats up for election following boundary changes.

Third of council

One third of the council seats were up for election in 16 unitary authorities.

Non-metropolitan districts

Whole council

Seven non-metropolitan districts have all of their seats up for election.

Half of council

Six non-metropolitan districts have half of their seats up for election.

Third of council

54 district councils had one third of their seats up for election. Weymouth and Portland originally had elections scheduled for 2018, but the elections were postponed indefinitely following a decision to merge the council into a unitary Dorset Council from 2019 onwards.

These were the last elections to Daventry District Council, following the decision to abolish it along with Northamptonshire County Council and its 7 district councils into two unitary authorities in 2020.

Mayoral elections

There were five local authority mayoral elections and one metropolitan mayoral election.

Combined authorities

Local authorities

Notes

References

 
2018 elections in the United Kingdom
2018
May 2018 events in the United Kingdom